Dr. Marion Blank is the creator of the Reading Kingdom reading program and the director of the A Light on Literacy program at Columbia University in New York. She is a developmental psychologist with a specialization in language and learning who has spent over fort

Dr. Blank has developed a unique and comprehensive model for teaching reading that is based on six critical skills. Two are physical skills: the visual sequencing skills for reading the fine motor performance for writing, and four are language skills: phonology, semantics, syntax and discourse. This model allows reading to be taught to a wide variety of children, including those for whom reading attainment is highly problematic, such as non-verbal autistic children.

Her latest books The Reading Remedy and Spectacular Bond and her latest program, the Reading Kingdom, are designed to make her system easily available to parents so that they may prevent or overcome the reading failure that afflicts about 40% of the school population across the nation.

Education
Blank has her bachelor's degree from the City University of New York. She also has a Master's degree in education from that institution. She has a Masters of Public Health degree from Columbia University and a Ph.D. from the University of Cambridge.

Career
Dr. Blank is currently on the faculty of the Department of Child Psychiatry at Columbia University where she created the Light on Literacy program. She is also a licensed psychologist. She also devotes considerable time and energy to producing books, articles, software programs and tests (including the widely used Preschool Language Assessment Instrument, a test published in both in English and Spanish, that is designed to assess the verbal communication skills of children in the preschool years).

From 1973 to 1983, Dr. Blank was a Professor in the Department of Psychiatry at Rutgers Medical School (a component institution of the University of Medicine and Dentistry of New Jersey). In that capacity, she served as the director of a research unit in reading disabilities. From 1960 to 1973, she was on the faculty of the Department of Psychiatry at the Albert Einstein College of Medicine in New York where her work included serving as the Director of the teaching program of the interdisciplinary Training Program.

Awards and recognition
Throughout her career, Dr. Blank has been the recipient of many awards and commendations. She recently received the Upton Sinclair Award, which honors individuals who have made a significant contribution to education while displaying great courage in the process. Her software reading program, Sentence Master, received the Special Education Software Award from the Software Publishers Association and a Certificate of Achievement in the Johns Hopkins University National Search. She has been the recipient of a U.S. Public Health Service Career Development Award, an Award of Commendation from the New Jersey Speech and Hearing Association and the Elwyn Morey Memorial Lectureship in Australia. In 1996, she was the National Tour Lecturer for the Australian Speech/Language Association. She was the 1994 and 1995 New Jersey nominee for the Frank R. Kleffner Clinical Career Award of the American Speech-Language Hearing Association.

In addition, she is a member and fellow of the American Psychological Association, and a member of the Association of Children with Learning Disabilities. She has served on the editorial boards of a number of journals concerned with the issues of language and learning (e.g., Child Development, Applied Psycho- linguistics, Child Development and Care) as well as the boards of numerous committees including the William T. Grant Foundation and the National Institute of Child Health and Human Development.

Personal life 
Anarchy TV was directed by Jonathan Blank, her son.

References

External links 
 

 
 https://www.amazon.com/Reading-Remedy-Essential-Skills-Reader/dp/047174204X

Developmental psychologists
Living people
Alumni of the University of Cambridge
Columbia University Mailman School of Public Health alumni
City College of New York alumni
Graduate Center, CUNY alumni
Yeshiva University faculty
University of Medicine and Dentistry of New Jersey faculty
Columbia University faculty
Year of birth missing (living people)